Baelen is a municipality of Wallonia located in the province of Liège, Belgium. 

On January 1, 2006, Baelen had a total population of 4,060. The total area is 85.73 km² which gives a population density of 47.36 inhabitants per km².

The municipality consists of the following districts: Baelen and Membach.

Notable people
Born in Baelen:
 (1904–1944), priest and member of the Belgian Resistance during World War II
Residing in Baelen:
Sunday Oliseh, a former Nigerian footballer and coach
Marc Lacroix, biochemist and breast cancer researcher

See also
 List of protected heritage sites in Baelen

References

External links
 

 
Municipalities of Liège Province